Ras-related GTP-binding protein B is a protein that in humans is encoded by the RRAGB gene.

Ras-homologous GTPases constitute a large family of signal transducers that alternate between an activated, GTP-binding state and an inactivated, GDP-binding state. These proteins represent cellular switches that are operated by GTP-exchange factors and factors that stimulate their intrinsic GTPase activity. All GTPases of the Ras superfamily have in common the presence of six conserved motifs involved in GTP/GDP binding, three of which are phosphate-/magnesium-binding sites (PM1-PM3) and three of which are guanine nucleotide-binding sites (G1-G3). Transcript variants encoding distinct isoforms have been identified. MTORC1 responds to amino acids via interaction with RAGB.

References

Further reading